Hi-Yo Silver is a 1940 American Western film, directed by William Witney and John English. It stars Lee Powell, Hi-Yo Silver, and Chief Thundercloud and was released on April 10, 1940. The film was created by condensing the fifteen chapters of the 1938 film serial The Lone Ranger.

Plot
This 1940 feature version of the 1938 serial shows the first live depiction of the Ranger. A rag-tag band of Confederate Army deserters led by Captain Mark Smith captures, then murders Colonel Marcus Jeffries after discovering that he's a newly appointed Commissioner of Finance  sent by the U.S. Treasury Department to Texas to collect taxes. Smith then assumes Jeffries identity and over time  sets into play  his plan to conquer Texas and rule it as a  dictator. The Texas Rangers sent to investigate are ambushed, but one survives. He is nursed back to health by Tonto and swears to avenge the massacre.

Cast list
 Lee Powell as The Lone Ranger, aka Allen King
 Hi-Yo Silver as Silver
 Chief Thundercloud as Tonto
 Bruce Bennett as Bert Rogers (credited as Herman Brix)
 Lynne Roberts as Joan Blanchard
 Stanley Andrews as Jeffries
 George Cleveland as Blanchard
 William Farnum as Father McKim
 Hal Taliaferro as Bob Stuart
 Lane Chandler as Dick Forrest

References

External links 
 
 
 

1940 Western (genre) films
1940 films
American Western (genre) films
Films directed by William Witney
Films directed by John English
Republic Pictures films
Films produced by Sol C. Siegel
American black-and-white films
1940s American films